Wallace Laird Wright was a Scottish amateur football outside left who played in the Scottish League for Queen's Park. He was capped by Scotland at amateur level.

References 

Scottish footballers
Queen's Park F.C. players
Scottish Football League players
Scotland amateur international footballers
Association football outside forwards
Year of death missing
Footballers from Glasgow
1912 births
People from Govanhill and Crosshill